Khargone Super Thermal Power Station is a coal-based thermal power project, located at village Selda and Dalchi in Khargone  district in Indian State of Madhya Pradesh.
It is the country's first ultra-super critical thermal power plant. The Khargone plant operates at an efficiency of 41.5 per cent, which is 3.3 per cent higher than the conventional super-critical ones, with steam parameters of 600 degree Celsius temperatures and 270 kg per centimeter square pressure.

The high efficiency results in less coal consumption for generating same amount of electricity with respect to super critical plants and will result in the reduction of 3.3 per cent carbon dioxide emissions.

Central Industrial Security force guards this power station. Cisf unit get induction in NTPC Khargone on 4 August 2020

The project site is about 105 km from Indore, 50 km from Khargone and about 30 km from Sanawad town. The site is approachable from Sanawad on Indore – Khandwa State Highway through PWD road, from Bediya on  Khargone - Sanawad road and another approachable from Makarkheda on Mhow - Khargone State Highway 01. Nearest Railway Station is Sanawad on Indore – Khandwa section is about 32 km.

Installed capacity

References

Coal-fired power stations in Madhya Pradesh
Khargone district
2019 establishments in Madhya Pradesh
Energy infrastructure completed in 2019